The Artsakh Conservative Party is an Armenian political party in Artsakh.

History
The Artsakh Conservative Party was established on 26 February 2019. Its founder and current party leader is David Babayan.

On 5 February 2020, it was announced that Babayan would run for the presidency of Artsakh and that he would lead the party in the 2020 Artsakhian general election.

Ideology
The party maintains a centre-right political position and advocates for Artsakh’s sovereignty, maintaining a high level of security and strengthening democracy, social justice and environmental protection.

Electoral record
Following the 2020 election, the party gained just 2.87% of the votes after the first round of voting, failing to qualify for the second round. Furthermore, the party failed to gain any seats in the National Assembly. Currently, the party acts as an extra-parliamentary force.

See also

List of political parties in Artsakh
Politics of Artsakh

References

External links
 Artsakh Conservative Party Facebook page

Political parties in the Republic of Artsakh
Political parties established in 2019